Series 5 of Top Gear, a British motoring magazine and factual television programme, was broadcast in the United Kingdom on BBC Two during 2004, consisting of nine episodes between 24 October and 26 December; a compilation episode featuring the best moments of the series and the previous series, titled "Best of Top Gear", was aired on 2 January 2005, and charted the best moments from Series 4 and 5.

Episodes

Best-of episodes

References 

2004 British television seasons
Top Gear seasons